The following articles contain lists of royal residences:
List of palaces
List of royal palaces
Spanish royal sites
List of British royal residences
List of Danish royal residences
List of Hawaiian royal residences
List of Moroccan royal residences
List of Serbian royal residences
List of Thai royal residences